Paulina Pancenkov, (born 29 November 1999) is a Swedish singer and finalist in Idol 2020. She grew up in Bjuv. On 27 November, 2020, she along with  Nadja Holm made it to the final of the TV4 singing competition Idol 2020. In the final she placed second. She is the sister of singer Suzi P.

Pancenkov competed as a singer in Lilla Melodifestivalen in 2014.

References

External links 

Idol (Swedish TV series) participants
Living people
1999 births
Swedish pop singers
Swedish people of Croatian descent
21st-century Swedish women singers